Piotr Uszok (born 1955 in Mikołów) is a Polish politician.

Since 1990 member of Katowice City Council. Deputy mayor of Katowice from 1994 to 1998. Mayor of Katowice since 1998; elected again in 2002, 2006 and 2010. Head of Council of Upper-Silesian Metropolis. No official party allegiance, considered as a center-right politician (elected for the first time with the recommendation of Akcja Wyborcza Solidarność).

References

External links
Official homepage

1955 births
Living people
Polish politicians
People from Mikołów